The 2011 Fordham Rams football team represented Fordham University in the 2011 NCAA Division I FCS football season. The Rams were led by sixth year head coach Tom Masella and played their home games at Coffey Field. They are a member of the Patriot League.

Fordham was not eligible for the Patriot League championship because they used scholarship players while the rest of the league's members did not.

They finished the season 1–10, 0–6 in Patriot League play to finish in last place.

Schedule

References

Fordham
Fordham Rams football seasons
Fordham Rams football